WBOX may refer to:

 WBOX (AM), a radio station (920 AM) licensed to Bogalusa, Louisiana, United States
 WBOX-FM, a radio station (92.9 FM) licensed to Varnado, Louisiana, United States